"Mind Disease" is a song written by the Harrow-based band Ritual. The song was released by Red Flame Records as a single in October 1982. It was produced by the band and engineered by Chris Stone.

Picture sleeve

The front of the picture sleeve featured artwork by Simon Cohen, while the artwork on the back was done by Ritual guitarist Jamie Stewart.

Formats and track listing

7": Red Flame / RF 712 (United Kingdom)
"Mind Disease"
"Nine"

Personnel

Errol Blyth - vocals
Mark Bond - bass guitar
Steve Pankhurst - saxophone
Ray Mondo - drums
Jamie Stewart - guitars

References

أنظر ايضا
Hip hop music

R&B Songs

Romantic (song)

External links
Ritual at Discogs

1982 singles
1982 songs